Anton Mlinaric is an Australian professional footballer who plays as a central defender. Mlinaric is currently a free agent, having most recently played for Brisbane Roar.

Career

Brisbane Roar
Mlinaric began his professional career with A-League club Brisbane Roar, making his debut in the 2021-22 season. Mlinaric made 14 appearances for the Roar in all competitions before he was released on a free transfer in the January transfer window the following season.

References

External links

Living people
2002 births
Australian soccer players
Australian people of Croatian descent
Association football defenders
Brisbane Roar FC players
A-League Men players
National Premier Leagues players